Bedlinog railway station served the village of Bedlinog in the historic county of Glamorgan, Wales, from 1876 to 1964 on the Rhymney Railway.

History 
The station opened on 1 February 1876 by the Rhymney Railway. It was situated to the south west of Rodw Road. It closed on 15 June 1964.

References

External links 

Disused railway stations in Merthyr Tydfil County Borough
Railway stations in Great Britain opened in 1876
Railway stations in Great Britain closed in 1964
1876 establishments in Wales
1964 disestablishments in Wales
Former Rhymney Railway stations